Hugh Hudson (25 August 1936 – 10 February 2023) was an English film director. He was among a generation of British directors who would begin their career making documentaries and television commercials before going on to have success in films. 

Hudson directed the 1981 Academy Award and BAFTA Award Best Picture Chariots of Fire, a film ranked 19th in the British Film Institute's list of Top 100 British films. He continued to direct commercials while making films, which included the British Airways face advertisement from 1989 made in collaboration with London-based advertising agency Saatchi & Saatchi.

Early life 
Hugh Hudson was born at 27 Welbeck Street, London, the son and only child of Michael Donaldson-Hudson and his second wife Jacynth Mary Ellerton, from Cheswardine in rural northeast Shropshire. Michael's father was Ralph Charles Donaldson-Hudson, and his great-grandfather was Charles Donaldson-Hudson, a one-time Conservative Member of Parliament for Newcastle-under-Lyme, Staffordshire. His paternal ancestors came from Scotland and Cumberland. He was sent to boarding school in 1942 at the age of six, and thereafter was educated at Eton College. He began his National Service in the Dragoon Guards from 28 January 1956, reaching the rank of second lieutenant and remained as a lieutenant in the Army Reserve of Officers until he was discharged on 16 January 1960.

Career

1960s 
In the 1960s, after three years of editing documentaries in Paris, Hudson headed a documentary film company with partners Robert Brownjohn and David Cammell. The company produced, among others, the documentaries A for Apple, which won a Screenwriters' Guild Award, and The Tortoise and the Hare, which was nominated for a BAFTA Award. The company emerged with much success in the 1960s, winning many awards and pioneering a new graphic style for documentary and advertising films.

Hudson then began a career in advertising, producing and directing many television commercials. He worked alongside Alan Parker, Ridley and Tony Scott for Ridley Scott Associates (RSA), a British film and commercial production company founded in 1968. His first filmmaking job was as a second-unit director on Parker's Midnight Express (1978).

1970s–1980s 
Between 1973 and 1975, Hudson wrote and directed Fangio, A life at 300 km/h, a documentary film about motor racing seen through the eyes of Juan Manuel Fangio, five times the world Formula 1 Champion.

From 1979 to 1980, Hudson directed his first and most successful feature film, Chariots of Fire (1981), the story of two British track runners, one a devout Christian and the other an ambitious Jew, in the run-up to the 1924 Olympic Games. The film is said to have revitalized the fading British film industry, and it won four Academy Awards, including Best Picture; Hudson earned a nomination for Best Director. His friend and colleague Vangelis created an Academy Award-winning score for the film.

Vincent Canby of the New York Times wrote in 1981 "It's to the credit of both Mr Hudson and Mr Welland that Chariots of Fire is simultaneously romantic and commonsensical, lyrical and comic. ... It's an exceptional film, about some exceptional people."
In 2017, some 37 years after its showing at the 1981 Cannes Film Festival, it was shown to a large audience at the Classic Screenings beach cinema to help support the bid for the 2024 Olympic Games to be held in Paris.

Hudson had rejected numerous feature film offers before Chariots of Fire'''s success. His next production was Greystoke: The Legend of Tarzan, Lord of the Apes (1984) which received four Oscar nominations, and was Ralph Richardson's last screen performance, for which he was nominated in the 1984 Oscars as Best Supporting Actor. It was a success at the box office and with critics.

In 1985, Hudson directed Revolution, which depicted the American War of Independence, and which was released before it was a fully completed film. The film was a critical and commercial failure at the box office and earned Hudson a Golden Raspberry Award nomination for Worst Director.

Hudson's next theatrical feature film was Lost Angels (1989), nominated for the Palme d'Or at the 1989 Cannes Film Festival. The film was an American-based drama starring Donald Sutherland and Ad-Rock of the Beastie Boys and dealing with disaffected youth in California.

1990s onward
In 1999, Hudson directed My Life So Far. Jean-Claude Carrière wrote of it, "Hugh Hudson's film My Life So Far is a delightful bittersweet film, which covers the start of a boy's life during the first part of the 20th century – from his last baby's bottle to his first cigar. A film which sadly is not known as well as it should be. It is a variation on a universal theme which will never end. There will always be men and women, old people and youngsters, horses and dogs." Hudson next directed I Dreamed of Africa (2000), which was the closing film of the Cannes Film Festival of that year.

In 2006, Hudson was reported to be working, together with producer John Heyman, on an historical epic based on the life of the monotheistic Egyptian Pharaoh Akhenaten and his wife Nefertiti. The film was to center around their tempestuous relationship.

In 2008, Hudson re-edited Revolution, giving the film a narration by Al Pacino. The Observer film critic Philip French writing about the new version said, "Revolution was misunderstood and unjustly treated on its first appearance twenty years ago. Seeing it again in the director's slightly revised version it now strikes me as a masterpiece – profound, poetic and original. Hudson's film should take its place among the great movies about history and about individual citizens living in times of dramatic social change. One hopes it will finally find the wide audience it deserves."

Hudson co-produced Chariots of Fire, the 2012 stage adaptation of the film of the same title. The stage adaptation was his idea, for the London Olympic year. Also in 2012, it was announced that Hudson would direct Midnight Sun, a feature film about a child who tries to help a family of polar bears on the shrinking polar ice cap. Hudson co-wrote the script as well. The script became The Journey Home with directors Roger Spottiswoode and Brando Quilici replacing Hudson.

In 2016, he staged his debut as an opera director with Robert Ward’s setting of   The Crucible at the Staatstheater Braunschweig. The sets and painted backdrops were designed by British artist Brian Clarke. The second run of the opera was to sold-out audiences.

In 2016, Hudson directed the period drama Altamira, about the discovery of the famous Spanish cave paintings. The film stars Antonio Banderas and Rupert Everett. The New York Times gave the film a glowing review. Released in two U.S. cities the film then was distributed by Netflix in USA/Canada and Sky in the UK. The Spanish release was very successful.

 Advertisements 
In 1988, Hudson directed a 2-minute advert for British Rail, a parody of the Post Office Film Unit's 25-minute documentary Night Mail, which was made in 1936. Poet W. H. Auden had written verse specifically to fit the original 1936 film's footage, which showed the enormous scale of BR's daily operation and the structure of the 'sectorised' business. The opening sequence of Hudson's British Rail advert features the northbound Travelling Post Office with Auden's original verse, narrated by Sir Tom Courtenay.

Some of the many other acclaimed advertisements created by Hudson include the 1989 British Airways "Face" advert seen in over 80 countries around the world and running for almost a decade; the 1979 Fiat Strada Figaro advert; and the Benson & Hedges "Swimming Pool" and "salvage" adverts . In 2007 he created his Silverjet advert, a direct parody of his own 1989 British Airways advert. He also created the Courage Best "Gercha" advert and the Cinzano "Aeroplane" advert. Hudson also directed Kinnock – The Movie (1987), an election broadcast for the British Labour Party.

Personal life and death
Hudson's first marriage on 25 August 1977, was with painter Susan Michie (born 8 December 1946), the daughter of Alastair Milne Michie, with whom he had a son, born in 1978. In November 2003, he married actress Maryam d'Abo, who played Kara Milovy in The Living Daylights (1987). They remained married until his death.

Hudson died at Charing Cross Hospital in London on 10 February 2023. He was 86.

Honours
In 2003, Hudson was given a special Cannes Lions award on the 50th Anniversary of the Cannes Lions International Advertising Festival, an award given only to directors who have won the Grand Prix more than once. Hudson won Grand Prix Cannes Lions awards for his 1972 Levi's "Walking Behinds" and 1978 Coty L'Aimant "French Lesson" adverts.

In August 2007, in Nîmes, France, "Un Realisateur dans la Ville", a festival created by Gérard Depardieu and Jean-Claude Carrière to showcase each year the work of one director, featured the work of Hugh Hudson, showing eight films over 5 days. The festival premiered an Al Pacino–narrated version of Revolution called Revolution Revisited.

In October 2008, at the Dinard Festival of British Film, Hudson's work was honoured. As a tribute five of his films were shown, with My Life So Far opening the festival. Revolution Revisited was the subject of a Q&A by the director.

 Filmography 

 International awards 
1981: Cannes Golden Palm – nomination – Chariots of Fire1981: Toronto Audience Award – Chariots of Fire1982: Academy Awards – Chariots of Fire – Best Picture; nomination as Best Director and 6 others
1982: Golden Globe – Best Foreign Film
1982: BAFTA – Best Picture. Chariots of Fire
1985. Academy Awards 4 Nominations - supporting actor. script. make up fxs.
1985: BFI – Technical achievement award – Greystoke1985: Cesar Awards – nomination, Best Foreign Film – Greystoke1985: Venice Film Festival Lion d'Or – nomination – Greystoke1986: Golden Raspberry Award – Revolution – nomination as Worst Director
1989: Palme d'Or at Cannes Film Festival – nomination, Lost Angels2000: Cannes Festival 2000 – nominated closing film – I Dreamed of Africa''
2005: Taormina Festival – award for Cinematic Art
2007: Cairo Film Festival – Silver Pyramid Award
2009 Prague Film Festival - Special award for contribution to cinematic art
2014 Bulgaria Sofia Film Festival . Award for contribution to cinema.
2017 Serbia Film Festival - Victor award for cinematic art.

Member of jury
Tokyo Film Festival (president) 1995
Istanbul Film Festival (president) 2001
Athens Film Festival (president) 2002
San Sebastian Film Festival 2003
Taormina (president and recipient of Arte award) Film Festival 2005
Mar del Plata Festival 2005
Tbilisi Film Festival (president) 2005
Sarajevo Film Festival 2006 and 2008
São Paulo Film Festival October 2008
Marrakesh Film Festival November 2008
Siberian Film Festival of Light (president) 2009
Vologda Independent Cinema from European Screens Festival (VOICES Festival)(President) July 2011
Bombay International Film Festival (president) 2011
Tlibisi Film Festival 2016
Lumiere Institution Lyon, France. Chariots of Fire and Fangio shown in weekend of sport in film
Yerevan international festival ( president) 2017

References

External links 
 

Hugh Hudson at BFI
Hugh Hudson at TCM UK
Hugh Hudson at ScreenOnline
Hugh Hudson at AllMovie
Hugh Hudson showreel
 

1936 births
2023 deaths
English film directors
Television commercial directors
People educated at Eton College
Film directors from London